was a village located in Nyū District, Fukui Prefecture, Japan.

As of 2003, the village had an estimated population of 4,033 and a density of 121.99 persons per km². The total area was 33.06 km².

On February 1, 2005, Miyazaki, along with the towns of Asahi and Ota (all from Nyū District), was merged into the expanded town of Echizen to create the new town of Echizen, and no longer exists as an independent municipality.

External links
Official website of Echizen (town) 

Dissolved municipalities of Fukui Prefecture
Echizen, Fukui (town)